Auerbach, German for "meadow-brook", may refer to the following:

Places

In Austria
Auerbach, Upper Austria, Braunau am Inn district

In Germany
Places:
Auerbach (Albtal), a village of Karlsbad, administrative area in Baden-Württemberg
Auerbach (Elztal), a district of Elztal, a municipality in Baden-Württemberg
Auerbach, Erzgebirgskreis, a municipality in Saxony
Auerbach (Horgau), a village of Horgau, in Bavaria
Auerbach in der Oberpfalz, a town in the Amberg-Sulzbach district, Bavaria
Auerbach, Lower Bavaria, a municipality in the Deggendorf district, Bavaria
Auerbach (Vogtland), a town in Saxony

Rivers:
Auerbach (Günz), tributary of the Günz, Bavaria
Auerbach (Kinzig), tributary of the Kinzig, Hesse

See also:
Auer Bach, a river of North Rhine-Westphalia

Other:
Auerbach Castle, in Bensheim, Hesse
Auerbachs Keller, a historic restaurant in Leipzig, made famous by Goethe's Faust I

People
Auerbach (surname), a German surname, including a list of people with that surname
Auerbach (Jewish family), a family of scholars of the 16th to 19th century

Other uses

Auerbach's plexus, a plexus of sympathetic nerve fibers
VfB Auerbach, German football club
Auerbach Publishing
Auerbach basis, in functional analysis